Adailiya is an area of Kuwait City; it is located in the governorate of Al Asimah in Kuwait. Its population in 2008 was 20,211. Several mosques are located in Adailiya. Adailiya has a Water Towers Park.

Education 
 The Public Authority for Applied Education and Training

Sports 
 As-Sadāqa Was-salām Stadium of Kazma Sporting Club.
 It is also home to headquarters of the Kuwait Football Association.
 It has a oxygen health gym.

Embassies in Adailiya 
Embassies in Kuwait
  Bhutan
  China PR
  Oman
  Qatar
  Tunisia

References

Populated places in Kuwait
Suburbs of Kuwait City